Mansfield College may refer to:

 Mansfield College, Oxford, one of the constituent colleges of the University of Oxford in Oxford, England
 Mansfield College of Art, merged with Nottinghamshire Technical College in 1976 to form West Nottinghamshire College of Further Education
 Mansfield University of Pennsylvania, a public university in Mansfield, Pennsylvania, United States
 , a former secondary school in Knutsford Terrace, Hong Kong